"The Scythe" is a short story by American author Ray Bradbury. It was originally published in the July 1943 issue of Weird Tales. It was first collected in Bradbury's anthology Dark Carnival and later collected, in revised form, in The October Country and The Stories of Ray Bradbury.

Plot summary
Through an odd stroke of luck, a poor family inherits a house, the wheat field surrounding it, and a strange scythe with the inscription "Who wields me--wields the world!" Every day the man of the family goes out to use the scythe in the field, but he notices strange things about the wheat and the way it grows. Over time, he comes to realize that every blade of wheat represents a human life, and that by accepting the house, the field and the scythe, he has unwittingly accepted the job of Grim Reaper.

References

External links
 

Short stories by Ray Bradbury
Fantasy short stories
1943 short stories
Pulp stories
Works originally published in Weird Tales